Paul C. Jerrard (April 20, 1965 – February 15, 2023) was a Canadian professional ice hockey defenceman who played five games in the National Hockey League for the Minnesota North Stars.

Jerrard was an assistant coach for the Omaha Mavericks of the National Collegiate Hockey Conference (NCHC). He was previously a coach for the Stars AHL affiliate, the Texas Stars. He served as assistant coach for the Utica Comets of the American Hockey League, and then, an assistant coach for the Calgary Flames.

Playing career
Jerrard was drafted in the 9th round of the 1983 NHL Draft by the New York Rangers from Athol Murray College of Notre Dame in Saskatchewan, a famous hockey school in Canada. After being drafted by the New York Rangers, he left Canada to play college hockey at Lake Superior State University, where he played all four seasons for the Lakers.

After graduating from LSSU, he joined the Colorado Rangers of the IHL. He would be traded to the Minnesota North Stars in 1988, where he played five games for in the 1988–89 NHL season. After this brief stint on the NHL, he would remain in the minors for the rest of his career, ending it with the Hershey Bears in 1997.

Coaching career
Jerrard began his coaching career with the Lowell Lock Monsters of the AHL in 1998. After coaching one season, he joined the staff of his alma mater, the Lake Superior State University hockey team. He spent four seasons with the Lakers before joining the Colorado Avalanche as an assistant coach. He left the next year for the Hershey Bears, where he stayed for 2 years before returning to the former Minnesota North Stars organization.

Jerrard remained with the Iowa Stars as an assistant coach before leaving in 2008. He rejoined the Dallas Stars organization in 2009 for the newly created Texas Stars, where he coached under Glen Gulutzan. When Gulutzan was promoted to become the coach of the Dallas Stars, he brought Jerrard with him. On May 14, 2013, Gulutzan and Jerrard were fired.

On August 12, 2013, Jerrard was hired by the Vancouver Canucks to be assistant coach of their AHL affiliate, the Utica Comets.

On July 6, 2016, Jerrard was hired by the Calgary Flames as an assistant coach, who focused on developing Calgary's defence corps and improving their penalty kill. He was fired on April 17, 2018 along with assistant coach Dave Cameron and head coach Glen Gulutzan.

Jerrard then took an assistant coach job with the Omaha Mavericks of the National Collegiate Hockey Conference (NCHC) on May 25, 2018.

Personal life and death
Jerrard died from cancer on February 15, 2023 at a hospital in Omaha, Nebraska at the age of 57. Jerrard was survived by his wife and two daughters.

Career statistics

References

External links

1965 births
2023 deaths
Albany Choppers players
Athol Murray College of Notre Dame alumni
Black Canadian ice hockey players
Calgary Flames coaches
Canadian ice hockey defencemen
Colorado Avalanche coaches
Colorado Rangers players
Dallas Stars coaches
Denver Rangers players
Fort Wayne Komets players
Hershey Bears players
Kalamazoo Wings (1974–2000) players
Lake Superior State Lakers men's ice hockey players
Milwaukee Admirals (IHL) players
Minnesota North Stars players
New York Rangers draft picks
Ice hockey people from Winnipeg
Canadian ice hockey coaches